Wheatstone may refer to:

 Cape Wheatstone, in Antarctica
 Charles Wheatstone (1802–1875), a British scientist and inventor, eponymous for Wheatstone bridge
 Cooke and Wheatstone Telegraph
 Wheatstone, New Zealand, a locality in the Canterbury region
 Wheatstone Glacier, in Antarctica
 Wheatstone LNG
 Wheatstone bridge, a measuring instrument in electricity
 Wheatstone Corporation, an American manufacturing company

See also
 Whetstone (disambiguation)